Arvin is a given name and surname of Persian origin. 

Notable people with the name include:

Surname
 Nick Arvin, American engineer and writer
 Reed Arvin, American record producer, keyboardist and author
 Ann Arvin, American pediatrician and professor 
 Bahare Arvin, Iranian sociologist and reformist politician

Given name
 Arvin Moazami Godarzi, Iranian cyclist
 Arvin Booble, Mauritian politician

Arvin
Arvin
German-language surnames
Persian-language surnames